Defending champions Alfie Hewett and Gordon Reid defeated Stéphane Houdet and Nicolas Peifer in the final, 5–7, 6–3, [11–9] to win the men's doubles wheelchair tennis title at the 2018 US Open. Due to rain, the final was moved to Arthur Ashe Stadium, but it took place effectively behind closed doors, as all the spectators and TV crews had left.

Seeds

Draw

Bracket

External links 

 Draw

Wheelchair Men's Doubles
U.S. Open, 2018 Men's Doubles